Summit Lake is a lake in Timiskaming District, Ontario, Canada, about  southeast of the community of Latchford, and  north of the Johnson stop and settlement on the Ontario Northland Railway mainline, which runs along the entire east side of the lake. Highway 11 (Frontier Route) runs just west of the lake.

Hydrology
There are no inflows. The primary outflow is an unnamed creek, towards Johnson Lake, at the south end of the lake, which eventually flows via Rib Lake, Net Creek, Net Lake, Cassels Lake, Rabbit Lake, the Matabitchuan River, Lake Timiskaming, and the Ottawa River into the St. Lawrence River.

References

Lakes of Timiskaming District